Stop is a hard rock / R&B album by the first incarnation of the Eric Burdon Band, whose line-up consisted of Burdon, John Sterling, Kim Kesterson and Terry Ryan.

The band was formed in 1971, after Burdon left his previous band War to cut an album with Jimmy Witherspoon. They recorded the 1971 album Guilty! and then, without Witherspoon, this album. Not released until July 1975, it featured no hit single, but did enjoy some American chart success, reaching both US and Canadian album charts.

The distinctive red and white gatefold sleeve, together with the plain white inner-sleeve, are die-cut octagonally in the shape of a traffic stop sign. Inside the gatefold one surface bears a large black and white portrait of Burdon, based on a photograph.

Track listing
 "City Boy" (3:50, Burdon, John Sterling)
 "Gotta Get it On" (2:57, John Sterling, Peter Hodgson)
 "The Man" (2:56, John Sterling, Jay Mitthauer, Terry Ryan)
 "I’m Lookin' Up“ (2:15, John Sterling, Kim Kesterson)
 "Rainbow" (2:39, Burdon, Kim Kesterson, Billy Ray Morris)
 "All I Do" (2:08, Burdon, Kim Kesterson, John Sterling)
 "Funky Fever" (2:48, Terry Ryan, John Sterling)
 "Be Mine" (8:20, John Sterling)
 "The Way it Should Be" (3:13, John Sterling)
 "Stop" (5:45, John Sterling, Kim Kesterson, Robert Haney)

Personnel

Musicians
Eric Burdon – lead vocals
Kim Kesterson, Randy Rice – bass guitar
John Sterling, Aalon Butler – guitar
Terry Ryan – keyboards
Alvin Taylor, George Suranovich – drums
Moses Wheelock, Alvin Taylor – percussion

Production
Producer: Jerry Goldstein
Recording engineers: Chris Huston, Dieter Dierks
Remix engineers:  Chris Huston, Ed Barton
Album design, design concept: Thomas Warkentin, Jerry Goldstein, Bob Weiner
Illustration (drawing): Thomas Warkentin (from photo by Jim Newport)
Management: Steve Gold, Far Out Management Ltd

Re-issue 
 In 1993, Avenue Records and Rhino Entertainment packaged the album, together with Sun Secrets, in a single re-issue, but without the song "Be Mine" (8:20) from Stop.

References

External links
 Stop at discogs.com
 

1975 albums
Eric Burdon albums
Albums produced by Jerry Goldstein (producer)
Capitol Records albums